Gravenreuth was a German noble family. The family's origin seat was located in Grafenreuth, now part of Thiersheim in the District of Wunsiedel in Upper Franconia, first mentioned in 1180. Up to the 18th century, the family, supplied with the title Freiherren, was the owner of nearby land and villages, e.g. in the area of Marktredwitz. Lines of the family moved to Upper Palatinate, e.g. in Schlammersdorf. The family is directly related with the House of Sparneck.

In the fellowship of the margraves from Bayreuth, members of the family were part of the Order of the Red Eagle and engaged in St Georgen under that with the foundation of the Gravenreuther Stift by Georg Christoph of Gravenreuth (1667-1736), offering a home and a religious life-style for poor unmarried older men. There is a line of Barons (German: Grafen) from 1825 to 1919. In 1816 the Hofmark Affing was bought, members of the family are still living there. A prominent member in World War II was Sigmund-Ulrich Freiherr von Gravenreuth.

References

Bavarian noble families
Franconian nobility